The Surveillance Camera Code of Practice is a code of practice devoted to the operation of CCTV systems in the United Kingdom. It was introduced under Section 30 (1) (a) of the Protection of Freedoms Act 2012.

The office of the Surveillance Camera Commissioner was created to support it.

References

External links
Surveillance Camera Code Of Practice
Surveillance Accessories For Security

Civil rights and liberties in the United Kingdom
Civil rights and liberties legislation
Video surveillance
Data laws of the United Kingdom